Walking,  or sometimes referred to as "The Wild", is a lecture by Henry David Thoreau first delivered at the Concord Lyceum on April 23, 1851. It was written between 1851 and 1860, but parts were extracted from his earlier journals. Thoreau read the piece a total of ten times, more than any other of his lectures. "Walking" was first published as an essay in the Atlantic Monthly after his death in 1862.

Transcendentalism in Walking/Form 
"Walking" is a transcendental essay that analyzes the relationship between man and nature, trying to find a balance between society and our raw animal nature.

Themes 

 Self-Reflection
 The Wild and Society
 Exploration

Writing Style 

“Walking” has autobiographical side of Henry David Thoreau as well, and reflects the author’s personal experiences. As Rebecca Solnit has stated in “Wanderlust: A History of Walking”, the rhythm of walking could be the sources of music, conversation, thoughts, and literature. In over ten years of walking, Thoreau kept observing nature, organizing his thought, and considering the best way to express his lecture; his diary shows what elements in his daily life influenced his environmental view and motivated him to write it. Above all, the author’s correspondence with friends provides not only his lecture career but also his works and his writing process. As a result, his essay is told by the voice of the confident narrator, given some authority. Moreover, using allusion, he succeeded in not only understanding the essay broader but also obtaining a form of poetry, and with his lecture and the new writing style, “Walking” became a new critique of the existing society.

See also
Walden
The Old Marlborough Road, a poem within "Walking"

References

Walking at Project Gutenberg

External links 

 
 Walking. As published in Atlantic Monthly, 1862. https://www.walden.org/wp-content/uploads/2016/03/Walking-1.pdf
 Nationalism and the Nature of Thoreau's "Walking" Andrew Menard. http://www.mitpressjournals.org/doi/pdf/10.1162/TNEQ_a_00229

1861 essays
American essays
Essays by Henry David Thoreau